The 2010 Lenoir–Rhyne Bears football team represented Lenoir–Rhyne University in the 2010 NCAA Division II football season. The Bears offense scored 358 points while the defense allowed 223 points.

Schedule

References

Lenoir-Rhyne
Lenoir–Rhyne Bears football seasons
Lenoir-Rhyne Bears football